Boldino is a rural locality (a village) in Pekshinskoye Rural Settlement, Petushinsky District, Vladimir Oblast, Russia. The population was 60 as of 2010. There are 7 streets.

Geography 
Boldino is located 23 km east of Petushki (the district's administrative centre) by road. Sushnevo-2 is the nearest rural locality.

References 

Rural localities in Petushinsky District
Pokrovsky Uyezd